Maicolpue or Maicolpué is a settlement and beach located on the  coast of Osorno Province, southern Chile. Its economy revolves around tourism subsistence farming and logging.

References

Beaches of Chile
Landforms of Los Lagos Region
Populated coastal places in Chile
Populated places in Osorno Province
Coasts of Los Lagos Region